Christian Bayo (born 12 April 1991) is a Puerto Rican swimmer. He competed in the men's 400 metre freestyle event at the 2017 World Aquatics Championships. In 2019, he competed in the men's 400 metre freestyle event at the 2019 World Aquatics Championships held in Gwangju, South Korea and he did not qualify to compete in the final.

References

1991 births
Living people
Puerto Rican male swimmers
Place of birth missing (living people)
Swimmers at the 2015 Pan American Games
Swimmers at the 2019 Pan American Games
Puerto Rican male freestyle swimmers
Pan American Games competitors for Puerto Rico